Flipkart Private Limited is an Indian e-commerce company, headquartered in Bengaluru, and incorporated in Singapore as a private limited company. The company initially focused on online book sales before expanding into other product categories such as consumer electronics, fashion, home essentials, groceries, and lifestyle products.

The service competes primarily with Amazon's Indian subsidiary and domestic rival Snapdeal. As of March 2017, Flipkart held a 39.5% market share of India's e-commerce industry. Flipkart has a dominant position in the apparel segment, bolstered by its acquisition of Myntra, and was described as being "neck and neck" with Amazon in the sale of electronics and mobile phones. 

In August 2018, American retail chain Walmart acquired a 77% controlling stake in Flipkart for US$16 billion, valuing Flipkart at around US$20 billion. Flipkart is valued at $37.6 billion as of 2022. It is planning to go public through a listing in the United States of America in 2023.

History 

Flipkart was founded in October 2007 by Sachin Bansal and Binny Bansal, alumni of the IIT, Delhi and former Amazon employees. The company initially focused on online book sales with country-wide shipping. Flipkart slowly grew in prominence and was receiving 100 orders per day by 2008. In 2010, Flipkart acquired the Bangalore-based social book discovery service WeRead from Lulu.com.

In 2011, Flipkart acquired the digital distribution business Mime360.com and the digital content library of the Bollywood portal Chakpak. Following the acquisition, Flipkart launched their DRM-free online music store Flyte in 2012. Due to competition from free streaming sites, Flyte was unsuccessful and shut down in June 2013.

With its eyes on India's retail market, Flipkart acquired Letsbuy, an online electronics retailer, in 2012, and Myntra, an online fashion retailer, for US$280 million in May 2014. Myntra continues to operate alongside Flipkart as a standalone subsidiary focusing on separate market segments.

In February 2014, Flipkart partnered with Motorola Mobility to be the exclusive Indian retailer of its Moto G smartphone. Motorola also partnered with Flipkart on the Moto E, a phone targeted primarily towards emerging markets such as India. High demand for the phone following its midnight launch on 14 May caused the Flipkart website to crash. Flipkart subsequently held exclusive Indian launches for other smartphones, including the Xiaomi Mi 3 in July 2014 (whose initial release of 10,000 devices sold out in around 5 seconds), and the Redmi 1S and Redmi Note in late 2014.

On 6 October 2014, coinciding with the company's anniversary and the Diwali season, Flipkart held a major sale that it promoted as "Big Billion Day". The event generated a surge of traffic, selling US$100 million worth of goods in 10 hours. The event received criticism via social media over technical issues experienced during the event and stock shortages.

In April 2015, Flipkart acquired Appiterate, a Delhi-based mobile marketing automation firm. Flipkart stated that it would use Appiterate's technology to enhance its mobile services. In December 2015, Flipkart purchased a minority stake in the digital mapping provider MapmyIndia.

In October 2015, Flipkart reprised the Big Billion Days event as a multi-day event exclusive to the Flipkart app. Flipkart bolstered its supply chain and introduced more fulfillment centers to meet customer demand. Flipkart achieved a gross merchandise volume of US$300 million during the event, with the largest volumes coming from fashion sales and the largest value coming from mobiles.

In 2016, Flipkart acquired the online fashion retailer Jabong.com from Rocket Internet for US$70 million and the UPI mobile payments startup PhonePe. In 2022, when PhonePe moved its entire base to India, Flipkart separated the ownership of PhonePe and shareholders in India and Singapore and the respective shareholders purchased shares of PhonePe's India entity directly. It was announced that a cash payout of approximately $700 Mn was to the former and current employees who were holding PhonePe's shares.

In January 2017, Flipkart made a US$2 million investment in TinyStep, a parenting information startup.

In April 2017, eBay announced that it would sell its Indian subsidiary, eBay.in, to Flipkart and invest US$500 million in the company. While eBay suggested that the partnership would allow Flipkart to access eBay's network of international vendors, these plans never came to fruition. In July 2017, Flipkart made an offer to acquire its main domestic competitor, Snapdeal, for US$700 to 800 million. It was rejected by Snapdeal, which was seeking at least US$1 billion.

In 2017, Flipkart sold 1.3 million phones in 20 hours on 21 September during its Big Billion Days promotion, doubling the number sold on the first day of the same event in 2016. Flipkart held a 51% share of all Indian smartphone shipments in 2017, overtaking Amazon India (33%).

On 4 May 2018, it was reported that Walmart had won a bidding war with Amazon to acquire a majority stake in Flipkart for US$15 billion. On 9 May 2018, Walmart officially announced its intent to acquire a 77% controlling stake in Flipkart for US$16 billion. Following the purchase, Flipkart co-founder Sachin Bansal left the company. The remaining management team reported to Marc Lore, CEO of Walmart eCommerce US. Walmart president Doug McMillon cited plans to help Flipkart with its sourcing and supply chain, while tapping on its expertise to expand Walmart globally. Indian traders protested against the deal, considering it a threat to domestic business.

In a filing with the U. S. Securities and Exchange Commission on 11 May 2018, Walmart stated that a condition of the deal prescribed the possibility that Flipkart's current minority shareholders "may require Flipkart to effect an initial public offering following the fourth anniversary of the closing of the transactions at a valuation no less than that paid by Walmart".

Following the announcement of Walmart's deal, eBay announced that it would sell its stake in Flipkart back to the company for approximately US$1.1 billion and relaunch its own Indian operations. The company stated that "there is the huge growth potential for e-commerce in India and significant opportunity for multiple players to succeed in India's diverse, domestic market." Softbank Group also sold its entire 20% stake to Walmart without disclosing terms of the sale. Walmart's acquisition of 77% stake in Flipkart was completed on 18 August 2018. Walmart also provided US$2 billion in equity funding to the company.

On 13 November 2018, Flipkart CEO Binny Bansal resigned after facing an allegation of "serious personal misconduct". Walmart stated that "while the investigation did not find evidence to corroborate the complainant's assertions against Binny, it did reveal other lapses in judgment, particularly a lack of transparency, related to how Binny responded to the situation."

In August 2019, Flipkart partnered with Authentic Brands to license and distribute Nautica in India. It was reported the same month that Flipkart entered talks to invest around US$40 million in last-mile delivery startup Shadowfax, which would be the company's third investment in the logistics sector after backing BlackBuck and QikPod. The deal was completed four months later as a US$60 million financing round. It also launched a reward system called Super coins which allowed customers to earn points on various Flipkart brands like Myntra, Cleartrip and Phonepe.

Flipkart invested US$4 million in the customer engagement and rewards platform EasyRewardz on 19 November 2019.

In 2020, Flipkart Wholesale launched a digital platform for kiranas and MSMEs. In July 2020, Flipkart acquired a 27% stake in Arvind Fashions Limited's newly formed subsidiary Arvind Youth Brands for US$35 million. Arvind Youth Brands owns the Flying Machine brand. Flipkart also announced it will roll out Flipkart Quick, a hyperlocal 90-minute delivery service for product categories such as groceries, home accessories, mobile phones, stationery, and more.

In October 2020, Flipkart acquired a 7.8% stake in Aditya Birla Fashion and Retail for US$204 million. The following month, Flipkart acquired the intellectual property of gaming startup Mech Mocha for an undisclosed amount. The acquisition formed part of Flipkart's plans to gain and retain users by offering casual games. In November 2020, Flipkart acquired augmented reality company Scapic, which provides a suite of tools to create and publish augmented reality, virtual reality, and 3D content quickly and without coding.

In April 2021, Flipkart announced the acquisition of travel booking portal Cleartrip.

In July 2021, Flipkart launched its social commerce marketplace called Shopsy, which allowed individuals and small businesses to direct sell and resell products to customers via social media channels. In December 2021, Shopsy entered the grocery delivery segment in 700 cities across India. Gujarati language was also added to their platform in 2021 which resulted in Flipkart being available in 8 local Indian languages that were Gujarati, Bengali, Odia, Hindi, Telugu, Kannada, Marathi and Tamil.Shopsy passed more than 100 million users in the month of September in 2022 with more than 60% of users coming to tier 2 and other cities.

In April 2022, Flipkart launched its first grocery fulfilment centre in Northeast India, based in Guwahati. The centre was reportedly women-run to support the career progression of Flipkart's female employees. The same month, the company established the Flipkart Foundation to support entrepreneurship and skill development within underserved communities in India. Flipkart also partnered with Narayanpet District - also known by its brand name Aarunya in Telangana that is known for handlooms and handicrafts to build capacity of local women artisans and have their products available for purchase online. Similarly, the organization also partnered with Government of West Bengal's  Micro, Small and Medium Enterprises and Textiles (MSME&T) Department to help local artisans, handcraft makers and weavers to get training and support to sell their products on the platforms via timebound incubation.

The total revenue in 2022 was that of ₹43,357 crore was reported for the past fiscal year of 2020-2021. This was 25% more than its revenue in the fiscal year of 2020. The losses were reported to have reduced by 23% to ₹2,445 Crore with total expenses of ₹45,801.

In 2022, Flipkart entered the  Non-Fungible Tokens (NFTs) and Web3 segment by letting the Indian purchasers of  Nothing Phone (1) to get Nothing's NFT through the app called Nothing Community Dots. These NFTs use Polygon blockchain to host it. The NFT drop happened at FireDrops - which was done on Flipkart's NFT marketplace, supported by GuardianLink. In October 2022, Flipkart also created a shopping platform that was metaverse-based, called Flipverse. The platform allows people to explore products and shop in a more interactive way. The Flipverse has been created through a partnership with a Polygon-incubated firm called eDAO, and Flipverse hopes to provide a similar experience to actual mall like shopping where people would be able to create their own Avatars.

Flipkart also entered the hotel industry for Indian and global market. The Flipkart Hotels uses Cleartrip API.

Business structure 
According to a report in November 2014, Flipkart operated with a complex business structure that included nine firms, some registered in Singapore and some in India. In 2012, Flipkart co-founders sold WS Retail to a consortium of investors led by Rajeev Kuchhal. Flipkart's Indian entities are owned by Flipkart Pvt. Ltd, which is registered in Singapore. The Singapore-registered entity owns eight Indian companies, including Flipkart Internet Pvt. Ltd, the company that runs the e-commerce marketplace Flipkart.com, Flipkart India Pvt. Ltd, the wholesale business, and Flipkart Logistics Pvt. Ltd, which runs Ekart (the internal logistics arm that can be used by other ecommerce players). Flipkart also started Flipkart Health+ (through an app) in 2021 that deals into providing medicines and health services through technology. This was started with the help of getting majority share in Sastasundar Marketplace Limited - an existing company that already was providing online pharmacy services.

Notable companies in which Flipkart Group owns a controlling stake include:

Flipkart has made 22 acquisitions and 24 investments, spending over US$395M for the acquisitions. Flipkart has invested in multiple sectors such as e-commerce, consumer electronics, local services and more. In 2022, it also revised it's policies for sellers in an attempt to make it more seller-friendly. This included simplifying the rate card and reducing fee for return costs.

Funding 
It later raised funding from venture capital firms Accel India (receiving US$1 million in funding in 2009) and Tiger Global (US$10 million in 2010 and US$20 million in June 2011). On 24 August 2012, Flipkart announced the completion of its 4th round of funding, netting a total of US$150 million from MIH (part of the Naspers Group) and ICONIQ Capital. The company announced on 10 July 2013 that it had raised an additional US$200 million from existing investors, including Tiger Global, Naspers, Accel Partners and Iconiq Capital.

In July 2013, Flipkart raised US$160 million from private equity investors.

In October 2013, it was reported that Flipkart had raised an additional US$160 million from new investors Dragoneer Investment Group, Morgan Stanley Wealth Management, Sofina SA, and Vulcan Inc., with a share of the funding coming from existing investor Tiger Global.

On 26 May 2014, Flipkart announced that it had raised US$210 million from Yuri Milner's DST Global and its existing investors Tiger Global, Naspers, and Iconiq Capital.

On 29 July 2014, Flipkart announced that it raised US$1 billion from Tiger Global, Accel Partners, Morgan Stanley Investment Management, and a new investor, Singaporean sovereign-wealth fund GIC.

In December 2014, after it received US$700 million from another round of funding, Flipkart had a market cap of US$11 billion.

On 20 December 2014, Flipkart announced its filing application with Singapore-based company regulator ACRA to become a public company. This announcement came after the company received US$700 million in long-term strategic investments from more than 50 Indian investors. The US$700 million in funding raised by Flipkart added new investors to the company's board, including Baillie Gifford, Greenoaks Capital, Steadview Capital, T. Rowe Price Associates, and Qatar Investment Authority. Its existing investors DST Global, GIC, ICONIQ Capital and Tiger Global also participated in this financing round. , Flipkart had raised US$550 million in additional funding from its existing investors in a deal that raised its total valuation to US$15 billion.

By August 2015, after raising another US$700 million, Flipkart had raised a total of US$3 billion over 12 rounds of funding from 16 major investors. In April 2017, Flipkart underwent another round of funding, receiving US$1.4 billion in funding from investors including eBay, Microsoft, and Tencent. On 10 August 2017, SoftBank Vision Fund invested another US$2.5 billion in Flipkart.

On 19 September 2018, Flipkart Marketplace Singapore injected ₹3,463 crore into Flipkart Internet. The transaction was done in two tranches, according to regulatory filings.

In March 2021, it was reported that Flipkart was considering the possibility of going public through a merger with a special-purpose acquisition company (SPAC) to speed up its listing process in the United States.

In 2022, the organization started Flipkart Ventures and created a venture fund of $100 Million to be invested in other 6 start-ups selected for Flipkart Leap Ahead, an accelerator program. Each start up will be given an equity investment of up to $500,000. Once the first cohort of Flipkart Leap was completed, the program was split in two distinct programs known as Flipkart Leap Ahead (FLA) and Flipkart Leap Innovation Network (FLIN).

Regulatory action and lawsuits 
In November 2012, the Indian Enforcement Directorate began investigating Flipkart for alleged violations of the foreign direct investment regulations of the Foreign Exchange Management Act of 1999. On 30 November 2012, Flipkart's offices were raided by the Enforcement Directorate. Documents and computer hard drives were seized by the agency. In August 2014, the Enforcement Directorate claimed that it had found Flipkart to be in violation of the Foreign Exchange Management Act. The Delhi High Court declared that several e-commerce firms, including Flipkart, had violated foreign investment regulations.

In January 2016, a public interest litigation hearing took place over Flipkart's alleged contravention of foreign investment norms. The court asked the Reserve Bank of India to provide the latest circular on foreign investment policy. The same month, the Department of Industrial Policy and Promotion (DIPP) clarified that it did not recognise the marketplace model of online retail. In February 2016, Health Minister J P Nadda announced that the Maharashtra FDA had taken action against Flipkart, among others, for selling drugs without a valid license.

Consumer Affairs 
A group of scammers was arrested by the police in Lucknow in 2022 who used the platform to scam the customers. The scam included replacing the online ordered Apple products with bricks to cheat customers and company. Such scams have also been reported in the past where soaps were delivered instead of iphones on Flipkart and also on Amazon.

House brands 
Flipkart operates several house brands, including Citron (home appliances) and Digiflip (formerly for electronics and accessories). In 2017, Flipkart launched additional house brands, including Billion (smartphones), Smartbuy (electronics accessories, effectively replacing Digiflip), and MarQ (for large appliances, although its launch was complicated by a trademark dispute with an existing company, Marc Enterprises).

In 2019, Flipkart began selling Nokia-brand televisions. A 55-inch, Android TV-based 4K Smart TV was the first product released under that licensing agreement. A 43-inch TV was unveiled on 4 June 2020.

Flipkart Video 
Flipkart launched an in-app streaming service called Flipkart Video in August 2019, so as to compete with industry rivals like Amazon who were also offering premium video options. The initial line up of content was curated from the service providers like Viu, Voot and TVF.

Flipkart Video Originals 
To strengthen its content offering on Flipkart Video, Flipkart forayed into original content production, known as Flipkart Video Originals. The first show was launched on 19 October 2019. Named Back Benchers, it was a Bollywood celebrity quiz show hosted by Farah Khan.

Criticism 
On 13 September 2014, a Flipkart deliveryman allegedly molested a housemaid in Hyderabad. The housemaid's employer sued Flipkart for this incident, citing the need for regulations to make offline delivery services safer.

In 2014, competitors such as Future Group (owner of retail chain Big Bazaar at that time) filed complaints with India's Ministry of Commerce and Industry, alleging that Flipkart's Big Billion Days discounts undercut prices in a manner predatory to other retailers. The ministry stated that it would look into the complaints.

In April 2015, Flipkart faced criticism for being a launch partner in the Airtel Zero program. Critics alleged that the zero-rating scheme violated the principles of net neutrality. Flipkart later pulled out of the project.

In 2015, around 400 delivery executives working with eKart, the logistics arm of Flipkart, went on strike to protest poor working conditions. Complaints included seven-day workweeks, extended hours, and a lack of clean toilets and medical assistance for bike riders involved in accidents. In 2016, delivery executive Nanjunda Swamy was murdered by a customer who did not have enough money to pay for a product. In response, Flipkart launched a safety initiative -'Project Nanjunda', named after the deceased executive. This included an SOS button in the mobile app (called the Nanjunda button) that could be used by field executives in case of emergencies.

Vendors on Flipkart have faced several challenges while doing business on the company's marketplace, to the extent that some of them have quit the portal. Some of these challenges include Flipkart's alleged unfair policies towards sellers, the lack of a competent logistics service, and customer returns that are a result of consumer fraud.

Awards and recognition 
 Sachin Bansal was awarded Entrepreneur of the Year, 2012–13 from The Economic Times, a leading Indian economic daily newspaper.
 In September 2015, the two founders entered Forbes India richest Indian by year, debuting in the 86th position with a net worth of US$1.3 billion each.
 In April 2016, Sachin and Binny Bansal were named to Time magazine's annual list of the 100 Most Influential People in the World.
 Flipkart was reported to be at top in the annual Fairwork India Ratings 2021 - which is a 10 point system that creates a score based on fair pay, conditions, contracts, management, and representation. A total of 11 platforms were evaluated by a consortium of Centre for IT and Public Policy (CITAPP), International IIIT Bangalore and global Fairwork network. Methodology included qualitative interviews with 19-20 workers in Delhi and Bangalore.

See also 
 E-commerce in India
 Online shopping

References

External links 

 

 
2007 establishments in Karnataka
2018 mergers and acquisitions
Book selling websites
Bookstores of India
Companies based in Bangalore
Indian brands
Indian companies established in 2007
Internet properties established in 2007
Privately held companies of India
Retail companies established in 2007
Walmart